Ramin Golestanian is a professor at the Department of Physics and the Rudolf Peierls Centre for Theoretical Physics at Oxford University. He is a fellow of St Cross College and is affiliated with the Oxford Centre for Soft and Biological Matter. In 2014 he was awarded the Fernand Holweck Medal and Prize for his "pioneering contributions to the field of active soft matter, particularly microscopic swimmers and active colloids".  In 2017 he was awarded the Pierre-Gilles de Gennes Lecture Prize. Ramin Golestanian is now director at the Max Planck Institute for Dynamics and Self-Organization in Göttingen, Germany, heading the department of Living Matter Physics.

He grew up in Tehran and graduated from Alborz High School in 1989. In the same year, he won a bronze medal at the 20th International Physics Olympiad (IPhO) in Poland. This was the first time Iran took part in this international competition. He obtained his B.Sc. from Sharif University of Technology (1993), and his M.Sc. (1995) and Ph.D. (1998) from the Institute for Advanced Studies in Basic Sciences (IASBS). He has been a visiting scholar at MIT, Postdoctoral Fellow at the Kavli Institute for Theoretical Physics at UCSB, Joliot Chair and CNRS Visiting Professor at ESPCI, and visiting professor at College de France. Before joining Oxford, he held academic positions at IASBS and the University of Sheffield.

References 

Iranian physicists
Academics of the University of Oxford
Living people
Iranian expatriate academics
1971 births
Max Planck Institute directors
Fellows of the American Physical Society